Schizothorax dulongensis is a species of ray-finned fish in the genus Schizothorax which occurs in Yunnan in China..

References

Schizothorax
Fish described in 1985